The Golden Fleece and the Heroes Who Lived Before Achilles is a children's book by Padraic Colum, a retelling of Greek myths. The book, illustrated by Willy Pogany, was first published in 1921 and was a Newbery Honor recipient in 1922.
The central myth retold is that of Jason and the Argonauts in their quest for the Golden Fleece and the aftermath. Woven into it are other myths, including the myths of Persephone and Prometheus, told by the poet Orpheus during the voyage.

References

External links
Online text of The Golden Fleece and the Heroes Who Lived Before Achilles

1921 short story collections
Children's short story collections
American short story collections
American children's books
Newbery Honor-winning works
Works based on classical mythology
1921 children's books
Works about the Argonauts